Ridge Landing Airpark , also known as Ridge Landing Airport, is a private use airpark located four nautical miles (7 km) west of the central business district of Frostproof,  Florida, United States. Ridge Landing is an airpark community located between Lake Wales and Sebring. Ridge Landing is centrally located between Orlando and Tampa and equidistant to Miami and Jacksonville. It is privately owned by John Fazzini.

Facilities
It has one asphalt paved runway designated 15/33 which measures 3,000 by 60 feet (914 × 18 m).

Ridge Landing is a gated community with grass taxiways and all roadways separate.  The runway has pilot controlled lighting and is controlled by the Ridge Landing Home Owner's Association. 

Ridge Landing offers airplanes and airport homes with private airstrips.

Nearest airports
Public use airports located in the vicinity include:
 X07 - Lake Wales Municipal Airport (8 nm N)
 KAVO - Avon Park Executive Airport (11 nm S)
 KBOW - Bartow Municipal Airport (15 nm NW)
 KGIF - Winter Haven's Gilbert Airport (20 nm NW)
 KCHN - Wauchula Municipal Airport (21 nm SW)

References

External links

Airports in Polk County, Florida
Residential airparks